Sung-ho, also spelled Seong-ho, is a Korean masculine given name. The meaning differs based on the hanja used to write each syllable of the name. There are 27 hanja with the reading "sung" and 49 hanja with the reading "ho" on the South Korean government's official list of hanja which may be used in given names. It was the sixth-most popular name for baby boys in South Korea in 1950, rising to first place in 1960, but was displaced from the top spot in 1970 by Ji-hoon.

People with this name include:

Entertainers
Sung Kang (Korean name Kang Sung-ho, born 1972), American actor of Korean descent
Park Seong-ho (comedian), (born 1974), South Korean comedian

Footballers
Hong Sung-ho (born 1954), South Korean football goalkeeper
Park Sung-ho (footballer) (born 1982), South Korean football forward
Choo Sung-ho (born 1987), South Korean football defender
Kang Song-ho (born 1987), Zainichi Korean football midfielder
Jung Sung-ho, South Korean football defender

Other sportspeople
Kim Seong-ho (born 1964), South Korean modern pentathlete
Nam Sung-ho (born 1975), South Korean sprint canoer
Jang Sung-ho (baseball) (born 1977), South Korean baseball first baseman and outfielder
Jang Sung-ho (judoka) (born 1978), South Korean judoka
No Sung-ho (born 1989), South Korean baseball pitcher

Other
Kim Sung-Hou (born 1937), Korean-born American mathematician
Seongho Cha, South Korean ballet dancer
Sung-ho Choi, South Korean-born American artist
Ji Seong-ho, North Korean defector

See also
List of Korean given names

References

Korean masculine given names